Lalo  is a town, arrondissement, and commune in the Kouffo Department of south-western Benin. The commune covers an area of 432 square kilometres and as of 2013 had a population of 119,926 people.

References
 

Communes of Benin
Arrondissements of Benin
Populated places in the Kouffo Department